The  is an annual Japanese anime awards giving to recognize the best in anime of the previous year, decided by the votes of readers of entertainment magazine Animage, published by Tokuma Shoten since July 1978. The Anime Grand Prix started in 1979, and the first prize was announced at the January issue of 1980, generally announced at the next year's June issue every year.

Title

Episode

Character

Voice acting
Megumi Hayashibara won 12 times and Akira Kamiya won 11 times. In 1994, Megumi Ogata won the voice actress, the Male character (Kurama) and the Female character (Haruka Tenoh).

Song

See also
 List of animation awards

References

External links
  
 List of winners 1979–2022

International awards
Animation awards
Anime awards
Awards established in 1979
Arts organizations based in Japan